Ram Frost (October 15th, 1954) is a Professor of Psychology at the Hebrew University of Jerusalem with affiliations to Haskins Laboratories in New Haven, USA, and The Basque Center for Cognition Brain and Language (BCBL) in San Sebastian, Spain.  He is a world leading expert on cross-linguistic differences in reading. His research on reading in Hebrew has changed the prevalent anglocentric theoretical perspectives of reading research, and has changed the educational system of Israel and its methods of teaching reading.

Education 
Ram Frost received his B.A in Psychology in 1980, his M.A. in 1983, and his Ph.D. in Cognitive Psychology in 1986, all at the Hebrew University of Jerusalem. He was a post-doctoral fellow at Haskins Laboratories 1986–1988, and a Fulbright fellow 1993–1994.

Scientific contributions 
Frost’s main contributions have been in the area of reading, visual word recognition, and statistical learning. He is mostly known for his landmark theoretical papers that had substantial impact on the field, offering novel and counter-intuitive perspectives. His Orthographic Depth Hypothesis  has argued, contrary to the then mainstream position, that spelling-to-sound correspondence leads to significant differences in reading strategies. His Strong Phonological Theory of Visual Word Recognition has argued that the fast recognition of letter-sounds drives reading in any writing system. His pivotal experimental work on morphological processing in Hebrew using fast presentation techniques has shown that the root structure of Semitic languages impact basic visual processing of letters. His research on letter-position coding in Hebrew has led to his recent comprehensive theoretical paper “Towards a Universal Theory of Reading”, arguing that writing systems evolve non-arbitrarily to reflect the language phonological and morphological structure. Therefore, contrary to common assumptions and intuitions, linguistic factors must be taken into account to understand even peripheral visual processing of print. 
Prof. Frost was Associate Editor of the journal Language and Cognitive Processes (1996-1999) and in 1999 he founded the International Morphological Processing Conference (MORPROC). 
In recent years Frost has argued for a novel theoretical perspective tying individual sensitivity to regularities in the environment (statistical learning), to assimilating the structural properties of a novel writing system. In 2016, Frost was awarded the ERC (European Research Council) Advanced research grant to lead a multinational investigation on what predicts ease or difficulty in learning to read in a second language.

References

External links 
The Department of Psychology, The Hebrew University
Haskins Laboratories
The BCBL
A short movie on the ERC research project

1954 births
Living people
Academic staff of the Hebrew University of Jerusalem
Hebrew University of Jerusalem Faculty of Social Sciences alumni
Israeli psychologists